Aphnaeus questiauxi is a butterfly in the family Lycaenidae. It is found in the Democratic Republic of the Congo (from the south-eastern part of the country to Lualaba) and Zambia.

References

External links
Die Gross-Schmetterlinge der Erde 13: Die Afrikanischen Tagfalter. Plate XIII 69 h

Butterflies described in 1903
Aphnaeus
Butterflies of Africa
Taxa named by Per Olof Christopher Aurivillius